is an active stratovolcano of the Kameda peninsula. It is located in Hakodate, Hokkaidō, Japan.

Geology
Mount Maru consists of non-alkali, mafic, volcanic rock. The andesitic volcano is topped with a lava dome.

Eruptive history
Mount Maru was last active some 200,000 years ago.

References

External links 
 Esan Maruyama - Geological Survey of Japan
 

Stratovolcanoes of Japan
Volcanoes of Hokkaido
Mountains of Hokkaido
Pleistocene stratovolcanoes